Fabio Gallia (born 20 August 1963) is Senior Advisor for Italy of Brookfield Asset Management, the leading alternative investment firm, and member of the European Business Heads board. Since the autumn of 2018, he is the Founder and CEO of Simple Equity Partners, a financial advisory firm supporting entrepreneurs and international investors in M&A and investment deals. From September 2020 to June 2022, he was the General Manager of Fincantieri. From July 2015 to July 2018, he held the position of Chief Executive Officer and General Manager of Cassa Depositi e Prestiti (CDP). He was also held the post of Vice Chairman of Italian Strategic Fund from 10 September 2015 to March 2016, a fund that was managed by CDP.

From 2009, he was Chairman of Findomestic Banca and, from 2012, he managed the BNP Paribas Group in Italy.

Career before Capitalia
He began his career in 1988 at consultancy firm Accenture.

In 1990 he was employed by Ersel Asset Management Sgr, the then Italian leading independent asset management firm (Giubergia Group), where he covered roles of increasing responsibility, before becoming General Manager and Partner in 1999.

Career at Capitalia Group
In 2002, he joined Capitalia  Group, then Italy’s third largest banking Group, as Co-General Manager and Chief Financial Officer in charge of the Group’s Finance, Wealth Management and Distribution. In 2003, he was appointed Chief Executive Officer of Fineco (listed sub-holding of the Capitalia Group): in 2005, Fineco was incorporated into Capitalia. From 2005 to 2007, he was Chief Executive Officer of Banca di Roma and Chairman of the Management Committee of the Capitalia Group.

Career at BNP Paribas Group
From 2008 he was Chief Executive Officer and General Manager of BNL -  BNP Paribas  Group and member of the Executive Committee of BNP Paribas. From 2009, he was Chairman of Findomestic Banca and, from 2012, he managed the BNP Paribas Group in Italy.

Career at Cassa Depositi e Prestiti
From July 2015 to July 2018, he held the position of Chief Executive Officer and General Manager of Cassa Depositi e Prestiti.

Other professional experience
He is board member of Edison (EDF Group) and Telethon Foundation (leading research institution focusing on rare genetic diseases); he currently serves as a member of the Audit Committee of the European Society of Cardiology.

He held previous board positions in Borsa Italiana (Italian Stock Exchange), MTS (electronic trading platform), Ariston Thermo (Merloni Group, heating systems), Coesia (Seragnoli Group, packaging machinery), Manifatture Sigaro Toscano, Mooney (formerly SisalPay), Museo Egizio di Torino Foundation and both in insurance and asset management businesses.

In 2018, he founded Simple Equity Partners, a financial advisory firm, and became Senior Advisor of Brookfield Asset Management.

From September 2020 to June 2022, he was the General Manager of Fincantieri.

Education

He graduated in 1987 with a degree in Business and Economics from the University of Turin. From 1989, he is in the register of the Italian chartered accountants. He is married, has two sons and lives in Rome.

Honours

In June 2013 Fabio Gallia was named “Chevalier” of the National Order of Legion of Honour of the France Republic.

In May 2015 Fabio Gallia was appointed Knight of Labour of the Italian Republic.

In February 2019, he received a PhD honoris causa in Management, Banking and Commodity Sciences from La Sapienza University in Rome.

References

External links
Fabio Gallia's Bio on en.cdp.it 

1963 births
Living people
Italian bankers
20th-century Italian businesspeople
21st-century Italian businesspeople
BNP Paribas people
People from Alessandria
Chief investment officers
Italian chief executives